is a former Japanese football player.

Club statistics

References

External links

1982 births
Living people
Kansai Gaidai University alumni
Association football people from Osaka Prefecture
Japanese footballers
J1 League players
J2 League players
Tokyo Verdy players
Sagan Tosu players
Oita Trinita players
Association football goalkeepers